Francis William Harvey (28 September 1930 – 10 November 1986) was an Anglican priest of the  second half of the  20th century.

He was educated at Chester College and ordained in 1962. He was a curate at St Ann's Rainhill and then  vicar of St Mark's Edge Lane.  He was the Diocese of Liverpool's planning adviser and then the area secretary of the London Diocesan Fund and later its pastoral secretary. In 1978 he became Archdeacon of London, and died in post, aged 56.

Notes

1930 births
Alumni of the University of Chester
Archdeacons of London
Holders of a Lambeth degree
1986 deaths